Benny P. Nayarambalam is an Indian screenwriter who works in Malayalam films and theatre. He wrote his first theatrical play Athyunnathangalil Deivathinu Sthuthi at the age of 19, for the production company owned by Rajan P. Dev, in which he also performed as Rajan's son. He has a post-graduate degree in Malayalam literature. He made his debut in films as screenwriter through First Bell (1992), directed by P. G. Viswambharan.

Benny had a successful career as a screenwriter, with most of his films turning into blockbusters. And two of his theatre plays Vikalanga Varsham and Arabikkadalum Adbudavilakkum were made into films, Kunjikoonan (2002) and Chanthupottu (2005) respectively. In Chanthupottu, Dileep and Lal played the roles Benny and Rajan P. Dev portrayed in the original play.

Personal life 
He is married to Fulja and has two children Anna Ben and Susanna Ben. Anna Ben debuted in Madhu C. Narayanan's first directorial Kumbalangi Nights (2019) as Babymol and received critical acclaim for her commendable performance.

Filmography

References

External links 
 
Hindu.com
Villagevoice.com
Hindu.com

Living people
Indian male screenwriters
Year of birth missing (living people)
Screenwriters from Kerala
Malayalam screenwriters
20th-century Indian dramatists and playwrights
21st-century Indian dramatists and playwrights
People from Ernakulam district
20th-century Indian male writers
21st-century Indian male writers